Renato Corti (1 March 1936 – 12 May 2020) was an Italian cardinal and prelate of the Roman Catholic Church. He was Bishop of Novara from 1990 to 2011. Pope Francis raised Corti to the rank of cardinal on 19 November 2016.

Early years
Renato Corti was born in Galbiate in the province of Lecco, part of the Archdiocese of Milan on 1 March 1936. He studied at the seminary in Milan and was ordained on 28 July 1959 by Cardinal Giovanni Battista Montini (later Pope Paul VI). His assignments included serving as parochial vicar of the Oratory of Caronno Pertusella from 1959 to 1967, spiritual director at the College of Gorla Minore from 1967 to 1969, and spiritual director of the archdiocesan seminary of Saronno from 1969 to 1977. He then became rector for theology at the seminary of Saronno. He became vicar general of the Milan Archdiocese in November 1980.

Episcopacy
Pope John Paul II named him auxiliary bishop of the Archdiocese of Milan on 30 April 1981 and titular bishop of Zallata. He received episcopal ordination on 6 June 1981 from Archbishop Carlo Maria Martini, with Bishops Libero Tresoldi and Bernardo Citterio as co-consecrators. The same pope named him Bishop of Novara on 19 December 1990 to succeed Aldo Del Monte, and he was installed on 3 March 1991.

In November 2007, four months after Pope Benedict XVI issued new rules about use of the 1962 Roman Missal (see Summorum Pontificum), three priests in the Novara diocese refused to celebrate Sunday Mass unless allowed to celebrate the Tridentine Mass exclusively. Corti suspended them.

While Bishop of Novara he served terms as vice president of the Italian Bishops Conference (2000 to 2005) and vice president of the Regional Bishops Conference of Piedmont. He also held assignments in the Roman Curia as a member of the Congregation for the Oriental Churches and the Congregation for the Evangelization of Peoples.

Pope Benedict XVI accepted his resignation as bishop of Novara on 24 November 2011. In retirement he continued to lead spiritual exercises for both religious and lay groups. He lived at Rho, near the college of the Oblates of St. Ambrose and St. Charles.

Corti was known for his work as a spiritual director. Pope John Paul II asked him to lead his Lenten retreat in 2005 and at the invitation of Pope Francis he wrote the meditations used at the Stations of the Cross at Rome's Colosseum in 2015.

Pope Francis raised Corti to the rank of cardinal at a consistory held on 19 November 2016. He was given the rank of Cardinal-Priest and assigned the titular church of San Giovanni a Porta Latina.

Death
Corti died in Rho at the age of 84 on 12 May 2020.

Works
 
 Il miracolo sarebbe la santità. Meditazioni sul ministero sacerdotale (1999)

References

External links
 
 

1936 births
2020 deaths
20th-century Italian Roman Catholic bishops
21st-century  Italian Roman Catholic bishops
People from the Province of Lecco
Members of the Congregation for the Oriental Churches
Members of the Congregation for the Evangelization of Peoples
Spiritual teachers
21st-century Italian cardinals
Cardinals created by Pope Francis